William Henry Bather (12 December 1861 – 3 January 1939) was an English cricketer. He was born at Meole Brace near Shrewsbury, third son of John Bather of Day House, Meole Brace. He played six first-class matches for Cambridge University Cricket Club between 1882 and 1883. He also played cricket at county level for Hertfordshire and, between 1879 and 1892, for Shropshire.

He was educated at Rossall School and Cambridge University, where he was a scholar at Pembroke College, graduating B.A. in 1883 and M.A. in 1887.

He later became a Church of England clergyman, being ordained deacon in 1886 and priest in 1887 by the Bishop of St Albans. He was an assistant master at Elstree School (1884-94), and curate of Aldenham (1886-88) and Cheshunt (1894-97) in Hertfordshire, and in Shropshire vicar of Meole Brace 1897-1930 and rector of Sutton near Shrewsbury 1899-1931. He served as manager at the National School in Meole Brace.

He married Ida Agnes McDonell, daughter of Frederick Lumb Wanklyn, of Buenos Aires, Argentina. He lived in retirement at Boscombe, Hampshire, where he died.

See also
 List of Cambridge University Cricket Club players

References

External links
 

1861 births
1939 deaths
English cricketers
Cambridge University cricketers
Sportspeople from Shrewsbury
Marylebone Cricket Club cricketers